Aleksandar Miljković may refer to two Serbian footballers:

 Aleksandar Miljković (footballer born 1982), midfielder
 Aleksandar Miljković (footballer born 1990), defender